Dennis L. Horlander (born September 6, 1952) is an American politician and a Democratic member of the Kentucky House of Representatives who represented District 40 from January 1, 1997 to January 1, 2019.

Education
Horlander attended the University of Louisville.

Elections
2012 Horlander was unopposed for the May 22, 2012 Democratic Primary and won the November 6, 2012 General election with 11,039 votes against a write-in candidate.
1996 Horlander won the five-way 1996 Democratic Primary and won the November 5, 1996 General election against Republican nominee Kim Jefferson.
1998 Horlander was unopposed for both the 1998 Democratic Primary and the November 3, 1998 General election.
2000 Horlander was unopposed for both the 2000 Democratic Primary and the November 7, 2000 General election, winning with 8,998 votes.
2002 Horlander was challenged in the 2002 Democratic Primary, winning with 2,269 votes (76.6%) and was unopposed for the November 5, 2002 General election, winning with 6,609 votes.
2004 Horlander was unopposed for both the 2004 Democratic Primary and the November 2, 2004 General election, winning with 10,632 votes.
2006 Horlander was unopposed for both the 2006 Democratic Primary and the November 7, 2006 General election, winning with 6,871 votes.
2008 Horlander was unopposed for both the 2008 Democratic Primary and the November 4, 2008 General election, winning with 11,698 votes.
2010 Horlander was unopposed for both the May 18, 2010 Democratic Primary and the November 2, 2010 General election, winning with 7,293 votes.
2018 Horlander lost the Democratic Primary to Nima Kulkarni, who went on to win the general election.

References

External links
Official page at the Kentucky General Assembly
Campaign site

Dennis Horlander at Ballotpedia
Dennis L. Horlander at the National Institute on Money in State Politics

Place of birth missing (living people)
1952 births
Living people
Democratic Party members of the Kentucky House of Representatives
Politicians from Louisville, Kentucky
University of Louisville alumni
21st-century American politicians